Greater administrative regions or greater administrative areas were top-level administrative divisions of the Communist-held Liberated Zone in Northern China and later the nascent People's Republic of China that directly governed provinces and municipalities. These were the largest-ever political divisions of China and were controlled by the Central People's Government. They were dissolved between June and November 1954.

List 
The greater administrative regions originated from the districts governed by governors-general established during the late Qing dynasty. The six greater administrative regions were:

History 
The highest officials of the greater administrative regions were known as chairmen. (From this historical origin derives the term still used today for the top officials of China's autonomous regions.)

The North China Region was the first to be abandoned on October 31, 1949, given the People's Republic by now had been established with Beijing as capital city. The provinces it governed were thenceforth directly controlled by the North China Branch of the Government Administration Council of the Central People's Government instead. In May 1952, control was again transferred, this time to the North China Administrative Council of the Government Administration Council.

Several other large-scale entities governed parts of China's territory during this time and were equivalent to greater administrative regions:

 Inner Mongolia Autonomous Region
 Local Government of Tibet i.e. (Kashag) 
 The Executive Committee of Qiongyai Minority Nationality Autonomous Region from 1949, later assigned to Central and South China region; the predecessor of Hainan

Except the Northeast, which was governed by a People's Government, the regions' highest government bodies were Military and Administrative Committees, which were replaced by administrative councils in November 1952.

Several domains in China today retain the same structure of geographic divisions as the GAAs. Military administrative regions, the divisions of some major banks, and civil aviation districts are still divided in the same form as the greater administrative regions.

See also
 History of the administrative divisions of China

Administrative divisions of China
Federalism in China